The 13351 / 13352 Dhanbad–Alappuzha Express is an Express train belonging to East Central Railway zone that runs between  and  in India. It is currently being operated with 13351/13352 train numbers on a daily basis, earlier it runs between Bokaro and Chennai so it was named as Bokaro-Madrass express .

Service

The 13351/Dhanbad–Alappuzha Express has an average speed of 45 km/hr and covers 2546 km in 57h. The 13352/Alappuzha–Dhanbad Express has an average speed of 46 km/hr and covers 2546 km in 55h 30m. From April first 2019 the train will not touch Shornur Junction, pass through link line and will halt at Ottappalam and Wadakkanchery in both directions.

Route and halts 

The important halts of the train are:

 
Katrasgarh
 
 
 
 
 
 
 
 
 
 
 
 
 
 
 
 
 
 
 
 
 
 
 Ottappalam 
        Wadakkanchery

Coach composition

The train has standard LHB rakes with max speed of 130 kmph. The train consists of 22 coaches. It consist one 1st AC , four 2nd AC , six 3rd AC , five Sleeper , three General second class , two SLRD/EOG & one Pantry Car Coach.

Direction reversal

The train reverses its direction two times:

Rakes 

The train has six dedicated rakes.
It ran as link train with 18189/18190 Tatanagar–Alappuzha Express but was discontinued when Indian Railways started phasing out link services.

See also 

 Alappuzha railway station
 Dhanbad Junction railway station
 Dibrugarh–Kanyakumari Vivek Express
 Ernakulam–Patna Express (via Chennai)
 Ernakulam–Patna Express (via Tirupati)

Notes

External links 

 13351/Dhanbad–Alappuzha (Bokaro) Express
 13352/Alappuzha–Dhanbad (Bokaro) Express

References 

Transport in Dhanbad
Transport in Alappuzha
Express trains in India
Rail transport in Jharkhand
Rail transport in West Bengal
Rail transport in Odisha
Rail transport in Andhra Pradesh
Rail transport in Tamil Nadu
Rail transport in Kerala